Stanisław Swatowski (25 March 1934 – 18 February 2008) was a Polish sprinter. He competed in the 400 metres at the 1960 Summer Olympics and the 1964 Summer Olympics.

References

1934 births
2008 deaths
Athletes (track and field) at the 1960 Summer Olympics
Athletes (track and field) at the 1964 Summer Olympics
Polish male sprinters
Olympic athletes of Poland
Place of birth missing